Buried may refer to:

Television episodes
 "Buried" (Breaking Bad)
 "Buried" (Fear the Walking Dead)
 "Buried" (Law & Order: UK)
 "Buried" (Prison Break)

Other uses
 Buried (performance art), artwork by Abel Azcona
 Buried (film), a 2010 thriller film
 Buried (TV series), a 2003 British drama series

See also
 Burial (disambiguation)
 Bury (disambiguation)